The 2020 Morelos Open was a professional tennis tournament played on outdoor hard courts. It was the seventh edition of the tournament which was part of the 2020 ATP Challenger Tour. It took place in Cuernavaca, Mexico between 17–23 February 2020.

Singles main draw entrants

Seeds 

 1 Rankings as of 10 February 2020.

Other entrants 
The following players received wildcards into the singles main draw:
  Thomaz Bellucci
  Alex Hernández
  Shintaro Mochizuki
  Luis Patiño
  Manuel Sánchez

The following players received entry from the qualifying draw:
  Mauricio Echazú
  Ruan Roelofse

Champions

Singles 

 Jurij Rodionov def.  Juan Pablo Ficovich 4–6, 6–2, 6–3.

Doubles 

 Luke Saville /  John-Patrick Smith def.  Carlos Gómez-Herrera /  Shintaro Mochizuki 6–3, 6–7(4–7), [10–5].

References

2020
Morelos Open
2020 in Mexican tennis
February 2020 sports events in Mexico